Sir Cordell Firebrace, 3rd Baronet (20 February 1712 – 1759), of Long Melford, Suffolk, was a British landowner and Tory politician who sat in the House of Commons from 1735 to 1759.

Firebrace was the only son of Sir Charles Firebrace, 2nd Baronet, of Stoke Golding, Leicestershire and his wife Margaret Cordell, daughter of Sir John Cordell, 2nd Baronet, MP, of Long Melford, Suffolk. His grandfather was a London vintner. In 1727, he succeeded to the baronetcy on the death of his father. He matriculated at St John's College, Oxford on 9 May 1729. He married Bridget Evers, widow of Edward Evers of Ipswich, and Washingley, Lincolnshire and daughter of Philip Bacon of Ipswich on 25 October 1737.
 
Firebrace was returned unopposed as a Tory Member of Parliament for Suffolk at a by-election on 5 March 1735. He was probably unwell at the time of the divisions on the Spanish convention in 1739 and the place bill in 1740 when he was absent. At the 1741 British general election he was returned unopposed again for Suffolk. He voted against the Government in all recorded divisions except on the Hanoverians in 1746, when he was absent again. He spoke against the bill to abolish hereditary jurisdictions in Scotland on 14 April 1747. 

After the Jacobite rebellion in 1745, in response to insinuations, he was at pains to argue that he never was in the least disposed to the Pretender's interest but 'did associate and subscribe to support his Majesty' with his 'life and fortune' during the late rebellion. At the 1747 British general election, he was returned for Suffolk in a contest. He also had a considerable interest at Ipswich and elsewhere, which he gave to Frederick, Prince of Wales. In Egmont's lists of people who would receive office on the accession of Frederick, Firebrace was marked down as a lord of the Admiralty. His only recorded speech in this Parliament was made in the debate of 19 February 1753 on Nova Scotia.

In 1740, in his capacity as local magistrate in Long Melford, he oversaw the interview of Edward Humfrey in connection to the murder of Charles John Frew.

Firebrace was returned unopposed as a Tory again for Suffolk at the 1754 British general election. No speech by him is recorded after 1754 but he was included in Newcastle's list of 1757 of 'speakers and efficient men' and was placed in Pitt's group.

Firebrace died without issue on 28 March 1759 and the baronetcy became extinct.

References

1712 births
1759 deaths
British MPs 1734–1741
British MPs 1741–1747
British MPs 1747–1754
British MPs 1754–1761
Members of the Parliament of Great Britain for English constituencies
Baronets in the Baronetage of England
Tory MPs (pre-1834)